Hassi Abdallah may refer to:
Hassi Abdallah, Algeria, a village in Béchar Province, Algeria
Hassi Abdallah, Mauritania, a village and rural commune in Mauritania